Mega Image is a supermarket chain, established in Romania in 1995, owned by Ahold Delhaize. It operates 806 stores under the name Mega Image, in Argeș, Bihor, Brașov, Bucharest, Cluj, Constanța, Dâmbovița, Giurgiu, Iași, Ilfov, Prahova, Sibiu, Timiș, Bacău and Vrancea counties.

History
The chain was established in 1995. In 2000 it was acquired by the Delhaize group that later merged into Ahold Delhaize, and like most Delhaize properties, has a logo of a lion, like the Serbian Maxi, and Food Lion in the Southeastern United States.

Products
Mega Image sells minimally processed foods like vegetables, breads and cheeses, as well as packaged processed foods and candies. Other items for sale include spices, sauces, residential cleaning supplies, and pet foods. Some Mega Image stores with more traffic also sell ready-to-eat foods like salads and pastas.

References

External links
Official website

Ahold Delhaize
Supermarkets of Romania
Retail companies established in 1995